The year 2012 is the 3rd year in the history of the Fight Nights Global, a mixed martial arts and kickboxing promotion based in Russia. It started broadcasting through a television agreement with  REN TV.

List of events

Fight Nights: Battle Of Moscow 6

Fight Nights: Battle Of Moscow 6 was a mixed martial arts and kickboxing event held by Fight Nights Global on March 8, 2012 at the Crocus City Hall in Moscow, Russia.

Background

Result

Fight Nights: Battle in Kalmykia

Fight Nights: Battle in Kalmykia was a mixed martial arts and kickboxing event held by Fight Nights Global on May 4, 2012 at the Uralan Stadium in Elista, Russia.

Background

Result

Fight Nights: Battle Of Moscow 7

 Fight Nights: Battle Of Moscow 7  was a mixed martial arts and kickboxing event held by Fight Nights Global on June 7, 2012 at the Crocus City Hall in Moscow, Russia.

Background

Result

Fight Nights: Battle of the Kama

Fight Nights: Battle of the Kama was a mixed martial arts and kickboxing event held by Fight Nights Global on June 20, 2012 at the Universal Sports Palace Molot in Perm, Russia.

Result

Fight Nights: Battle Of Desne

Fight Nights: Battle Of Desne was a mixed martial arts and kickboxing event held by Fight Nights Global on September 17, 2012 at the Bryansk Ice Palace in Bryansk, Russia.

Result

Fight Nights: Battle Of Moscow 8

 Fight Nights: Battle Of Moscow 8  was a mixed martial arts and kickboxing event held by Fight Nights Global on November 3, 2012 at the Sokolniki Arena in Moscow, Russia.

Background

Result

Fight Nights: Battle Of Moscow 9

 Fight Nights: Battle Of Moscow 9  was a mixed martial arts and kickboxing event held by Fight Nights Global on December 16, 2012 at the Dynamo Sports Palace in Moscow, Russia.

Background

Result

References

Fight Nights Global events
2012 in mixed martial arts
2012 in kickboxing
AMC Fight Nights